David Zhu Dai Wei (born 17 August 1990) is a Chinese racing driver competing in the FIA Formula Two Championship. He has competed in various Asian-based championships, including the Formula Challenge Japan championship, over the past five years, and has scored podiums in Formula BMW Asia in 2007 and the Formula Pilota China series last year.

2012 FIA Formula Two season
On 7 March 2012, Zhu became the first Chinese driver to race in any era of F2. "My overall target is top three for the year, although it will be tough."

Racing record

Complete FIA Formula Two Championship results
(key) (Races in bold indicate pole position) (Races in italics indicate fastest lap)

References

External links 
 

1990 births
Living people
Chinese racing drivers
Asian Formula Renault Challenge drivers
Formula BMW Asia drivers
Formula Challenge Japan drivers
Formula Masters China drivers
FIA Formula Two Championship drivers
TCR Asia Series drivers
Eurasia Motorsport drivers
20th-century Chinese people
21st-century Chinese people